The 2006 Major League Soccer season was the 11th season in the history of Major League Soccer.  It began on April 1, 2006, and ended with MLS Cup 2006 on November 12, 2006, at Pizza Hut Park in Frisco, Texas, for the second consecutive year.

Changes from 2005 season
The MetroStars were bought by Austrian company Red Bull and rebranded as Red Bull New York, with the playing squad known as the New York Red Bulls.
The San Jose Earthquakes players and head coach Dominic Kinnear moved to Houston, Texas, due to owner AEG being unable to secure a soccer specific stadium in San Jose, California. The team was to be renamed Houston 1836, but later changed its name to the Houston Dynamo.
In June, the Chicago Fire moved into their new soccer-specific stadium, Toyota Park, in Bridgeview, Illinois.

Final standings

Eastern Conference

Western Conference

Overall

MLS Cup playoffs

Conference semifinals

D.C. United advance 2–1 on aggregate.

New England Revolution advance 4–2 on penalties (2–2 aggregate after extra time).

Colorado Rapids advance 5–4 on penalties (4–4 aggregate after extra time).

Houston Dynamo advance 3–2 on aggregate.

Conference finals

New England Revolution advances 1–0 in single elimination.

Houston Dynamo advances 3–1 in single elimination.

MLS Cup 2006

The Houston Dynamo win MLS Cup 4–3 on penalties.

Team awards

MLS Cup: Houston Dynamo
U.S. Open Cup: Chicago Fire
MLS Supporters' Shield: D.C. United
MLS Reserve Division: Colorado Rapids

International competition

CONCACAF Champions' Cup Los Angeles GalaxyLost  Deportivo Saprissa in quarterfinals.

 New England RevolutionLost  LD Alajuelense in quarterfinals.

Individual awards

Top goal scorers

Goal-scoring totals

Team attendance totals

Coaches

Eastern Conference
D.C. United: Piotr Nowak
Kansas City Wizards: Bob Gansler and Brian Bliss

Western Conference
Chivas USA: Bob Bradley
FC Dallas: Colin Clarke
Houston Dynamo: Dominic Kinnear
Real Salt Lake: John Ellinger

External links
MLS 2006 Season Stats

 
Major League Soccer seasons
1